The Hawkins Family is a live album by Walter Hawkins released in 1980 on Light Records. The album was Grammy nominated in the category of Best Soul Gospel Performance, Contemporary.

Overview
Artists such as Maurice White and Philip Bailey of Earth, Wind & Fire appeared on the album.

Tracklisting

Cover versions
"What Is This" has been covered by gospel group 7 Sons of Soul. It is listed on their self-titled debut album recorded on the Verity Records label in 2004.

References

1980 albums
Light Records albums